Megachile corsica is a species of bee in the family Megachilidae. It was described by Benoist in 1935.

References

Corsica
Insects described in 1935